Halladay is an English and Scottish surname which may refer to:

Daniel Halladay (1826–1916), American engineer, inventor and businessman
Howard Hadden Halladay (1876–1952), Canadian politician
Roy Halladay (1977–2017), American baseball player

See also
Halladay (automobile), a defunct American automobile manufacturing company founded in 1905
Halladay Farmhouse, Duanesburg, New York, on the National Register of Historic Places
Halliday, a list of people with the surname Halliday or Haliday